Apple Mountain Lake is a census-designated place in Warren County, Virginia. The population as of the 2010 Census was 1,396.

References

External links

 Apple Mountain Lake community website

Census-designated places in Warren County, Virginia
Census-designated places in Virginia